The 2016 International Tournament of Spain was the 41st edition of the  and the 15th edition with the name of , held in Irun, Spain from  to , as a friendly handball tournament organized by the Royal Spanish Handball Federation as a preparation of the host nation to the 2016 European Men's Handball Championship.

Results

Round robin

Final standing

References

External links
 

2015–16 in Spanish handball
International Tournament of Spain
2016 in Spanish sport
Handball competitions in Spain